William Gibson (2 January 1865 – 2 January 1924) was a Scotland international rugby union player.

Rugby Union career

Amateur career 

He played for Royal HSFP.

Provincial career 

He played for Edinburgh District in their inter-city match against Glasgow District in December 1891.

He played for Cities District against Provinces District in December 1894.

International career 

He was capped fourteen times for Scotland between 1891 and 1895.

Business career 

He was a teller in the Commercial Bank of Scotland on George Street, Edinburgh.

Family 

His parents were John Gibson and Jane Ross. They had 5 sons including William.

Death 

The notice in The Scotsman newspaper stated that Gibson died suddenly.

His funeral took place in the Grange cemetery.

Confirmation to his estate went to his brother and next of kin Thomas Gibson, who was a Writer to the Signet. William Gibson left £1547 and 3 shillings in his estate.

References 

1865 births
1924 deaths
Scottish rugby union players
Scotland international rugby union players
Royal HSFP players
Edinburgh District (rugby union) players
Cities District players
Rugby union players from Edinburgh
Rugby union forwards